The Honor and Rights Convention (CDR) is a secular left-wing multi-ethnic political party established in 2011 in northern Syria during the Arab Spring.

The party has 2 politicians in the Democratic Assembly of the Federation of Northern Syria – Rojava and the party leader Meram Dawûd, is one of the nine members of Executive Council.

Ideology
The Honor and Rights Convention's secular values put it at odds with many of the more extremist Syrian opposition groups who are Salafists or Islamists, which has led to the party refusing to work with these groups and for them to condemn those foreign countries who arm and fund these types of groups in Syria. However it has also strongly criticised Russian support for the Syrian government and their military intervention in the country.

History
In early 2015, the party leader Meram Dawûd was arbitrarily detained by the Syrian Air Force Intelligence Directorate when he was being processed by Syrian Immigration at the Damascus International Airport after arriving back from a Syrian opposition conference in Cairo, Egypt.

References

2011 establishments in Syria
Organizations of the Syrian civil war
Political parties established in 2011
Political parties in Syria
Political parties in the Autonomous Administration of North and East Syria
Syrian democracy movements